Carlos Moisés da Silva (born 17 August 1967), known as Comandante Moisés (Commander Moisés), is a Brazilian politician who was the governor of Santa Catarina, having won the 2018 election in the state of Santa Catarina. He lost relection in 2022 to Jorginho Mello, not advancing into the second round.

References

1967 births
People from Florianópolis
Living people
Social Liberal Party (Brazil) politicians
Governors of Santa Catarina (state)
Brazilian firefighters